USA Today named its first All-USA high school football team in 1982. The newspaper has named a team every year since 1982.

In addition, two members of the team are named the USA Today High School Offensive Player and Defensive Player of the Year, respectively. The newspaper also selects a USA Today High School Football Coach of the Year.

Teams

1990 team
Coach of the Year: Tim Reynolds (Eisenhower High School, Lawton, Oklahoma)
Note: Bold denotes Offensive and Defensive Players of the Year, respectively, and ‡ denotes high school juniors

Offense

Defense

1991 team
Coach of the Year: Gary Guthrie (LaGrange High School, LaGrange, Georgia)
Note: Bold denotes Offensive and Defensive Players of the Year, respectively, and ‡ denotes high school juniors

Offense

Defense

1992 team
Coach of the Year: George Curry (Berwick High School, Berwick, Pennsylvania)
Note: Bold denotes Offensive and Defensive Players of the Year, respectively, and ‡ denotes high school juniors

Offense

Defense

1993 team
Coach of the Year: Chuck Kyle (St. Ignatius High School, Cleveland, Ohio)
Note: Bold denotes Offensive and Defensive Players of the Year, respectively, and ‡ denotes high school juniors

Offense

Defense

1994 team
Coach of the Year: Bruce Rollinson (Mater Dei High School, Santa Ana, California)
Note: Bold denotes Offensive and Defensive Players of the Year, respectively, and ‡ denotes high school juniors

Offense

Defense

1995 team
Coach of the Year: Bob Ladouceur (De La Salle High School, Concord, California)
Note: Bold denotes Offensive and Defensive Players of the Year, respectively, and ‡ denotes high school juniors

Offense

Defense

1996 team
Coach of the Year: Bruce Rollinson (Mater Dei High School, Santa Ana, California)
Note: Bold denotes Offensive and Defensive Players of the Year, respectively, and ‡ denotes high school juniors

Offense

Defense

1997 team
Coach of the Year: Thom McDaniels (McKinley High School, Canton, Ohio)
Note: Bold denotes Offensive and Defensive Players of the Year, respectively, and ‡ denotes high school juniors

Offense

Defense

1998 team
Coach of the Year: Bob Ladouceur (De La Salle High School, Concord, California)
Note: Bold denotes Offensive and Defensive Players of the Year, respectively, and ‡ denotes high school juniors

Offense

Defense

1999 team
Coach of the Year: John Parchman (Lee High School, Midland, Texas)
Note: Bold denotes Offensive and Defensive Players of the Year, respectively, and ‡ denotes high school juniors

Offense

Defense

Accumulated stats

References

High school football trophies and awards in the United States